Adebisi Victoria M Ekanoye (born 11 December 1981), known professionally as Victoria Ekanoye is an English actress. She is known for playing Angie Appleton in the ITV soap opera, Coronation Street. She has also played Rachel in The Royals, and has appeared in The Chase: Celebrity Special, The Big Quiz and The X Factor: Celebrity. She also appeared in series two of Almost Never and two episodes of Doctors as Kate Bennett. In 2022, she appeared in the fourth episode of Series 11 of the BBC crime drama series Death in Paradise, as Miranda Priestley.

Personal life 

Ekanoye has sickle cell anaemia. On 8 November 2021, Ekanoye announced that she had been diagnosed with breast cancer.

References

External links
 

Actresses from Greater Manchester
Black British actresses
English people of Nigerian descent
English soap opera actresses
Living people
People from Bury, Greater Manchester
1981 births
People with sickle-cell disease